Progressive Democratic Tribune, often referred to as al-Minbar, is a political organization launched by returning exiles from the underground communist National Liberation Front – Bahrain in 2001. Ahmad Al-Thawadi was its founding chairman. Effectively al-Minbar came to act as a successor to the NLF.

The party has been opposed to sectarian politics and sought to represent constituents whatever their creed. It was also a consistent champion of women's rights and freedom of speech, meaning that its MPs often found themselves allied with liberals. One of its three MPs, Abdulhadi Marhoon, served as the Deputy Speaker from 2002 to 2006.

Al-Minbar also has a youth organization, Shabeeba Society of Bahrain, that is active among the students and young workers with a network of regional and international connections with other left-wing democratic youth organizations.

Ahead of the 2006 election, al-Minbar launched the electoral bloc 'National Unity', which had 9 candidates for the Council of Representatives, 5 of whom were members of al-Minbar. None of its candidates were elected. At the 2018 election, al-Minbar won two seats for the Council of Representatives.

References

External links
al-Minbar website

2001 establishments in Bahrain
Arab nationalism in Bahrain
Arab socialist political parties
Bahraini uprising of 2011
Communist parties in Bahrain
Nationalist parties in Asia
Organizations of the Arab Spring
Political parties established in 2001
Political parties in Bahrain

International Meeting of Communist and Workers Parties